Vera Cruz is an unincorporated community in central Douglas County, Missouri, United States.

History
Vera Cruz was established in the 1840s and named for Vera Cruz in Mexico. The village was originally called Red Bud and was at the junction of the Rockbridge–Hartville road, up Bryant valley with the Old Salt Road or Rockbridge Road, which ran northwest through Smallett to Springfield. The name was changed to Vera Cruz in 1859. It was the first county seat of Douglas County. In 1870, the county seat was moved to Arno and shortly after to Ava.

A second battle occurred on November 3, 1864, near Wilson's Mill, during which the Confederate forces were driven out of the area.

Gallery

References

Unincorporated communities in Douglas County, Missouri
Unincorporated communities in Missouri